The four active synagogues of Gibraltar are colloquially known as the Great Synagogue, the Little Synagogue, the Flemish Synagogue, and the Abudarham Synagogue. The first synagogue established after the 1717 expulsion of Jews from Gibraltar, the Great Synagogue, was built on what is now known as Engineer Lane, and remains Gibraltar's principal synagogue. The Little Synagogue, founded in 1759 in Irish Town, was the result of the desire of Moroccan Jews for a less formal service. The lavish Flemish Synagogue was built at the turn of the nineteenth century on Line Wall Road, due to the request of some congregants for a return to more formal, Dutch customs. The last synagogue to be established in what is now the British overseas territory of Gibraltar, the Abudarham Synagogue, was founded in 1820 on Parliament Lane by recent Moroccan immigrants.

Background history

Jews resided in what is now the British overseas territory of Gibraltar by the 14th century, based on records which reveal a 1356 request for assistance in ransoming Jews that had been taken prisoner by pirates. In addition, after Jews were expelled from Spain in 1492, many went through Gibraltar en route to North Africa. During the 18th century, much of the rations of the British military forces were beef and pork.  Barrels of salted meat were provided by England and Ireland. However, in order to avoid scurvy, fresh provisions had to be procured for soldiers after a few months of salted or cured food. For soldiers stationed in Gibraltar, Morocco was the most convenient location to obtain fresh beef, although pork was not available from the Muslim country. Subsequently, starting in the early 18th century, after the 1704 capture of Gibraltar, Jewish merchants from Tetuan in Morocco were encouraged to come to Gibraltar with provisions. Their counterparts from Leghorn, Italy; Amsterdam, Netherlands; and London, England also settled in Gibraltar. As a result, by the time of the negotiation of the 1713 Treaty of Utrecht, there was already a thriving Jewish population in Gibraltar.

In those early years, starting about 1705, Jews met in private houses or in a warehouse in what is now Bomb House Lane. Some consider that warehouse on what was known as La Calle que va a la Plazuela de Juan Serrano to be Gibraltar's first synagogue founded under British rule. However, Spain insisted on language in the treaty that excluded Jews and Muslims from Gibraltar. "Her Britannic Majesty, at the request of the Catholic King, does consent and agree that no leave shall be given, under any pretext whatsoever, either to Jews or Moors to reside or have their dwellings in the said town of Gibraltar." Attempts to have the clause deleted were unsuccessful. In 1716, supplies began to arrive over the border with Spain, but the Spanish ambassador complained that there were substantial numbers of Jews living in Gibraltar, in violation of the terms of the treaty. The British government insisted that the Lieutenant-Governor of Gibraltar adhere to the terms of the 1713 treaty, and Jews were expelled from Gibraltar in 1717. However, under the terms of the Treaty of Utrecht, Spain lost Sardinia and Sicily. Despite that, in 1717, the same year as the expulsion of Jews from Gibraltar, Spain dispatched an expedition to recover Sardinia and Sicily. European countries, finally having peace after the War of the Spanish Succession, responded to Spain's actions by declaring war. Provisions no longer came across the border with Spain; accordingly, Jews were again allowed in Gibraltar so that supplies from Morocco would resume.

In 1721, a reciprocal treaty was negotiated with the Sultan of Morocco, Ismail Ibn Sharif, allowing both Jews and Muslims to settle in Gibraltar, and Englishmen to reside in Barbary (Morocco). "The subjects of the Emperor of Fez and Morocco, whether Moors or Jews, residing in the dominion of the King of Great Britain, shall entirely enjoy the same privileges that are granted to the English residing in Barbary." In 1726, Spain claimed that Britain had violated the terms of the 1713 Treaty of Utrecht, and used that as a pretext for attacking Gibraltar. The siege lasted for several months in 1727. The British government later endeavoured to balance the treaty with the Sultan with the terms of the Treaty of Utrecht. Subsequent treaties with Morocco limited the stay of Jews and Muslims to three months. However, this was ignored by the Governors of Gibraltar and, by 1777, 863 Jews lived in Gibraltar, three quarters of whom were natives of the country. The Jewish population in Gibraltar peaked in the 19th century. By 1805, they represented half of the population. By 1878, there were 1,533 Jews residing in Gibraltar.

The Great Synagogue

Isaac Nieto (1702 – 1774), a native of Leghorn, Italy, went to London as a child when his father David Nieto became Chief Rabbi of the Sephardi congregation of Spanish and Portuguese Jews. The Sephardi community's synagogue was constructed on Bevis Marks in that city. It was there that the younger Nieto received training as a rabbi from his father. Isaac Nieto was one of the Jewish merchants who settled in Gibraltar in the early eighteenth century. During the 1727 Siege of Gibraltar, he was Gibraltar's sole importer of food supplies from Morocco. Following the death of his father in 1728, Nieto returned to London where, in 1732, he was appointed Chief Rabbi of the Bevis Marks Synagogue. His partner James Argatt became the beneficiary of his decision to leave Gibraltar; the monopoly of Moroccan food imports was transferred to him.

After the return of the Jews to Gibraltar following their expulsion in 1717, the first synagogue was built. However, there is substantial disagreement between authorities as to whether the synagogue was built in 1723-4 or 1749. Isaac Nieto, sometimes spelled Netto, came from London to work as a merchant and to establish a synagogue in Gibraltar; he was also the first rabbi to lead its Jewish community. He named his synagogue Shaar Hashamayim. However, the synagogue is customarily referred to as the Great Synagogue. The Gibraltar synagogue was modeled after his father's London Sephardi synagogue on Bevis Marks, which was in turn an offshoot of the Amsterdam Sephardi synagogue. After the first Gibraltar synagogue was established, many Moroccan Jews continued to meet in makeshift groups and referred to the synagogue as the Dutch Synagogue.

The entrance to the original building was on Synagogue Lane, now Serfaty's Passage. Following its destruction in the storm of 30 December 1766, a larger synagogue was rebuilt at the same site in 1768, but with an entrance on Engineer Lane. The second building was also destroyed during attacks by the Spanish on 17 May 1781. A third building was constructed after the conclusion of the Great Siege of Gibraltar. In 1812, that version of the synagogue was damaged by fire and had to be partially rebuilt. The current vaulted ceiling of the synagogue dates from that 1812 renovation. The synagogue at 47/49 Engineer Lane has colourful tiles, marble floors, wrought iron spindles, and wooden furniture. The Great Synagogue not only remains active; it is still Gibraltar's principal synagogue.

The Little Synagogue

Gibraltar had two sets of synagogue customs. Spanish and Portuguese Jews were accustomed to the formality of Christian church services and, therefore, their services tended to be formal. However, in Morocco, Jews were prohibited from building places of worship under shariah law. Subsequently, they were accustomed to meeting in makeshift groups in their own homes and continued to do so in Gibraltar.They disliked the formal services at the Great Synagogue, which they referred to as the Dutch Synagogue. In 1759, the Yeshivah, Talmudic Academy, which had been established by Isaac Nieto in Irish Town, was converted into a synagogue for the Moroccan Jews. It was named Es Hayim, but is more commonly known as the Little Synagogue. It is believed to have been destroyed during the Great Siege of Gibraltar and later rebuilt. The Little Synagogue remains active; its location at 91 Irish Town is that of the former marketplace.

K K Nefusot Yehuda Synagogue (The Flemish Synagogue)

Nefusot Yehuda Synagogue (AKA La Esnoga Flamenca/Flemish Synagogue) is on Bomb House Lane in Gibraltar.
This new synagogue came about because some thought that Moroccan traditions had begun to dominate the services at the Great Synagogue. Some members of the congregation chose to establish a new synagogue that would adhere to the more formal Dutch customs. The late eighteenth century was a time of prosperity in Gibraltar. Subsequently, the congregants were able to afford the $26,300 (nearly £3,000) cost of Gibraltar's next synagogue. The new place of worship was built in a  garden and closely resembled the Amsterdam Sephardi synagogue, known as the Portuguese Synagogue. It was entitled Nefusot Yehudah, and opened in 1799 or 1800. It is commonly known as the Flemish Synagogue. An example of the lengths to which the congregation went to maintain Dutch traditions lies in the nature of their marriage contracts. The members of the Flemish Synagogue utilised sheets from a book with numbered pages for their marriage contracts, rather than the hand-illuminated parchment documents that were customary in Gibraltar.

The interior of the building was destroyed by fire in 1913. The architect who was responsible for its reconstruction was an Italian who was more familiar with the architecture of Catholic churches. As a result, the Flemish Synagogue has a beige, Dutch exterior and an Italian interior, with marble, and a reading desk incorporated into the ark for the Torah, instead of being positioned in the centre of the building. The interior design is modelled after the Dutch 'Esnoga'. After 1945, Moroccan tiles were installed in the interior of the synagogue, which has ornately patterned ceilings and walls. The only remnant of the original garden is a single palm tree in the synagogue's courtyard. The Flemish Synagogue, which remains an active place of worship, is located at 14 Bomb House Lane.

The Abudarham Synagogue

In 1804, Rabbi Solomon Abudarham died in a yellow fever epidemic. The following year, in 1805, Jews represented half of Gibraltar's population. In 1820, the Academy of Rabbi Solomon Abudarham on Parliament Lane was converted into a synagogue by those congregants of the Great Synagogue who were recent immigrants from Morocco and wanted a smaller, more informal setting. Earlier, the building had served as the Freemason's Hall. Accordingly, Parliament Lane is still referred to as Callejon de los Masones. The Abudarham Synagogue, is a small place of worship with wooden pews that face a bimah, the elevated platform on which the Torah is read. The fourth and last of the active synagogues to be established in Gibraltar is located at 19 Parliament Lane.

Recent history
Like the rest of the civilian population, the Jews were evacuated during World War II. Some of the population ended up in camps in Jamaica, where the diet was sometimes less than optimal and there were misunderstandings with Jews who were sent there as refugees from Nazi-occupied Europe. Some never returned to Gibraltar after the cessation of hostilities. In addition, in 1967, Francisco Franco closed the border with Spain after a referendum in which Gibraltar's residents expressed their desire to remain British. The border didn't completely reopen until 1985. The population dwindled during the twentieth century. However, the Jewish population has again begun to grow, and now numbers about 750, approximately 2% of Gibraltar's residents. The years between 2008 and 2011 were remarkable for a nearly 25% increase in the size of Gibraltar's Jewish community. Mark Benady, vice president of Gibraltar's Jewish community, is of the opinion that the area's infrastructure, including its four synagogues, could support a community of 2,000.

On the Gibraltar Tourist Board map at the city center, each synagogue is indicated by a prominent Star of David. All of Gibraltar's synagogues are proponents of Orthodox Judaism. The Chief Rabbi of Gibraltar is Rabbi Ron Hassid, who has presided over all four synagogues. In 2010, he was joined in Gibraltar by Rabbi Rafael Bitan, a native of Manchester. Bitan, a rabbinical judge, serves as the headmaster of the Jewish community's schools.

In December 2004, Jonathan Sacks, Chief Rabbi of the United Kingdom and Commonwealth, spoke at a service in the Great Synagogue which commemorated the 300th anniversary of the victory of the Anglo-Dutch fleet at Gibraltar. The occasion, which also served as a celebration of Gibraltar as a haven for Jews, featured the anthem God Save the Queen sung in Hebrew. In 2010, the Gibraltar Jewish Community Organisation celebrated the 95th anniversary of the founding of their organisation.

References

External links 

 Map of Gibraltar with locations of the four synagogues indicated

 
Jewish Gibraltarian history
Orthodox synagogues
Buildings and structures in Gibraltar